Standard Persian is the standard variety of Persian that is the official language of the Iran and Tajikistan and one of the two official languages of Afghanistan. It is a set of spoken and written formal varieties used by the educated persophones of several nations around the world.

As Persian is a pluricentric language, Standard Persian encompasses various linguistic norms (consisting of prescribed usage). Standard Persian practically has three standard varieties with official status in Iran, Afghanistan, and Tajikistan. The standard forms of the three are based on the Tehrani, Kabuli, and Bukharan varieties, respectively.

Written standards 
The Persian alphabet is used for both Farsi (Iranian) and Dari (Afghan). Traditionally, Tajiki is also written with Perso-Arabic script. In order to increase literacy, a Latin alphabet (based on the Common Turkic Alphabet) was introduced in 1917. Later in the late 1930s, the Tajik Soviet Socialist Republic promoted the use of Cyrillic alphabet, which remains the most widely used system today. Attempts to reintroduce the Perso-Arabic script were made.

See also 

 History of the Persian language
 Standard language

References

Standard Persian
Persian language
Persian dialects and varieties
Persian
Languages of Iran
Languages of Afghanistan
Languages of Tajikistan
Languages of Uzbekistan